Lupeol is a pharmacologically active pentacyclic triterpenoid.  It has several potential medicinal properties, like anticancer and anti-inflammatory activity.

Natural occurrences 
Lupeol is found in a variety of plants, including mango, Acacia visco and Abronia villosa. It is also found in dandelion coffee. Lupeol is present as a major component in Camellia japonica leaf.

Total synthesis 
The first total synthesis of lupeol was reported by Gilbert Stork et al.

Biosynthesis 
Lupeol is produced by several organisms from squalene epoxide. Dammarane and baccharane skeletons are formed as intermediates. The reactions are catalyzed by the enzyme lupeol synthase. A recent study on the metabolomics of Camellia japonica leaf revealed that lupeol is produced from squalene epoxide where squalene play the role as a precursor.

Pharmacology 
Lupeol has a complex pharmacology, displaying antiprotozoal, antimicrobial, antiinflammatory, antitumor and chemopreventive properties.

Animal models suggest lupeol may act as an anti-inflammatory agent. A 1998 study found lupeol to decrease paw swelling in rats by 39%, compared to 35% for the standardized control compound indomethacin.

One study has also found some activity as a Dipeptidyl peptidase-4 inhibitor and prolyl oligopeptidase inhibitor at high concentrations (in the millimolar range).

It is an effective inhibitor in laboratory models of prostate and skin cancers.

As an anti-inflammatory agent, lupeol functions primarily on the interleukin system. Lupeol to decreases IL-4 (interleukin 4) production by T-helper type 2 cells.

Lupeol has been found to have a contraceptive effect due to its inhibiting effect on the calcium channel of sperm (CatSper).

Lupeol has also been shown to exert anti-angiogenic and anti-cancer effects via the downregulation of TNF-alpha and VEGFR-2.

Famous anti-inflammatory ethno-medicinal plant Camellia japonica contains anti-inflammatory component lupeol in its leaf.

See also 

 Betulin
 Betulinic acid

References 

Triterpenes
Secondary alcohols
Total synthesis
Cyclopentanes